Jason Haldane (born 23 July 1971) is a British volleyball player. Born in Terrace, British Columbia, Canada, he competed for Great Britain in the men's tournament at the 2012 Summer Olympics.

References

British men's volleyball players
Volleyball players at the 2012 Summer Olympics
Olympic volleyball players of Great Britain
Olympiacos S.C. players
1971 births
Living people
People from Terrace, British Columbia
Sportspeople from British Columbia